This is a list of Bien de Interés Cultural landmarks in the Province of Cuenca (Spain), Spain.

La Casa Consistorial
Castillo de Moya
Castle of Alarcón
Cuenca Cathedral
Iglesia de Santiago Apóstol
Palacio de los Gosálvez
San Miguel Church, Mota del Cuervo

References 

Cuenca